Jay Dwight Hagood (born August 9, 1973) is a former American football offensive lineman.

Playing career
He briefly played for the New York Jets of the National Football League, before continuing his career in the NFL Europe. Hagood played college football at Virginia Tech.

A native of Easley, South Carolina, Hagood attended Easley High School, before spending a prep school year at Fork Union Military Academy.

References

External links
Just Sports Stats

1973 births
Living people
American football offensive tackles
Virginia Tech Hokies football players
New York Jets players
Frankfurt Galaxy players
Berlin Thunder players